"Roll On" is a song by British girl group Mis-Teeq. Produced by Blacksmith, it was recorded for the group's debut album, Lickin' on Both Sides (2001). The song was released as a double A-single along with a cover version of Montell Jordan's "This Is How We Do It" on 17 June 2002, marking the album's final single. Upon its release, it became another top-10 success for the group on the UK Singles Chart, peaking at number seven. "This Is How We Do It" is included on the Special Edition of Lickin' on Both Sides. The Rishi Rich mix of "This Is How We Do It" is featured in the 2002 film Ali G Indahouse, along with the original by Jordan. Mis-Teeq's version also appears on the film's soundtrack.

Music video
Instead of filming two separate music videos for the double A-side single, one music video was filmed combining both songs.  The video opens with "Roll On", starting with a group of men playing basketball in a court. The three members of Mis-Teeq (Alesha Dixon, Su-Elise Nash and Sabrina Washington) arrive in a lowrider and watch the men play basketball, and occasionally join in. Then it changes to dusk and cuts to the single "This Is How We Do It". The music video was filmed in various parts of Los Angeles, California in the US.

Track listings

UK CD single
 "Roll On" (Rishi Rich BhangraHop edit)
 "This Is How We Do It" (Rishi Rich Mayfair edit)
 "Roll On" / "This Is How We Do It" (video)

UK cassette single
 "Roll On" (Rishi Rich BhangraHop edit)
 "This Is How We Do It" (Rishi Rich Mayfair edit)
 "Roll On" (Rishi Rich radio mix)

European CD single
 "Roll On" (Rishi Rich BhangraHop edit) – 3:45
 "This Is How We Do It" (Rishi Rich Mayfair edit) – 3:27

Australian CD single
 "Roll On" (Rishi Rich radio mix)
 "This Is How We Do It" (Rishi Rich Mayfair edit)
 "Roll On" (Blacksmith Olde Skool mix)
 "This Is How We Do It" (Mayfair club rub)
 "Roll On" (Rishi Rich club mix)

Charts
All entries charted with "This Is How We Do It" except where noted.

Weekly charts

Year-end charts

References

2001 songs
2002 singles
Mis-Teeq songs
Song recordings produced by Blacksmith (musical group)
Telstar Records singles